North Carolina elected its members August 15, 1806.

See also 
 North Carolina's 10th congressional district special election, 1806
 United States House of Representatives elections, 1806 and 1807
 List of United States representatives from North Carolina

Notes 

1806
North Carolina
United States House of Representatives